State Route 149 (SR 149) is a state highway in the U.S. state of Maine. The highway runs  along the western banks of the Sandy River entirely in Franklin County. It complements SR 4, which runs on the east side of the river. SR 149 travels through Fairbanks (a neighborhood within Farmington), Strong, and Phillips.

Route description
SR 149 begins at an intersection in the Fairbanks neighborhood of Farmington at SR 4. The road, named South Strong Road, heads northwest and north past small houses before traveling into a wooded area east of the Sandy River. While traveling through this area, the road climbs and descends rolling hills. After passing through the settlement of South Strong, SR 149 continues traveling through forested areas before climbing a small hill to intersect SR 234 (Norton Hill Road). SR 149 and SR 234 form a concurrency and travel into downtown Strong along Norton Hill Road. At North Main Street, which carries SR 145, SR 234 ends but SR 149 continues along Lambert Hill Road first northwest, then west. As it descends a hill, it enters the town of Avon on River Road and then travels closer to the river than before. On this portion, SR 149 passes to the north small farms along the riverbed whilst passing south of wooded bluffs. After curving to the northwest, it enters Phillips and passes a line of small houses. It makes a 90-degree bend to the south to cross the Sandy River on a narrow bridge. It makes another 90-degree bend to the west to travel along Main Street through Phillips's business district.

Major junctions

References

External links

Floodgap Roadgap's RoadsAroundME: Maine State Route 149

149
Transportation in Franklin County, Maine
Farmington, Maine